The 2000 United States House of Representatives elections in Kansas were held on November 7, 2000 to determine who will represent the state of Kansas in the United States House of Representatives. Kansas has four seats in the House, apportioned according to the 1990 United States Census. Representatives are elected for two-year terms.

Overview

District 1

District 2

District 3

District 4

References 

2000 Kansas elections
Kansas
2000